The Hunter–Morelock House is a historic house located at 104 Holmes St. in Wallowa, Oregon. The house was built in 1903 for Charles A. Hunter, a Wallowa politician and businessmen; it was later purchased by J. P. Morelock, one of the founders and later mayor of Wallowa. The house's design incorporates the bungalow and Queen Anne styles; the design includes a veranda, a hip roof with a small dormer, and a double-hung sash central window. The dormer is trimmed in Eastlake style trim, and art glass is used extensively in the entrance and several interior windows.

The Hunter–Morelock House was listed on the National Register of Historic Places on February 28, 1985.

References

External links

Houses on the National Register of Historic Places in Oregon
Queen Anne architecture in Oregon
Bungalow architecture in Oregon
Houses completed in 1903
Houses in Wallowa County, Oregon
National Register of Historic Places in Wallowa County, Oregon
1903 establishments in Oregon